The Halit Efendi Mosque was built in 1415 at a time when North Macedonia was a part of the Ottoman Empire. It was reconstructed in 1936, 1969, 1987 and the last at 1994.

See also 
 List of the oldest mosques
 Macedonian Muslims
 Muftiship of Kumanovo
 Islam in North Macedonia
 Islamic Religious Community of Macedonia

References

External links 
 Gallery of mosques in Kumanovo area including Halit Efendi Mosque 

Ottoman mosques in North Macedonia
Lipkovo Municipality